Jana is the spelling of several unrelated given names. See Jaana for the Finnish and Estonian given name.

 Persian (Persian: جانا) My dearest, My soul. 
a Catalan and Occitan old name
In Cantabria it is the feminine form of Jano, a Celtic god based on the Roman Janus (see also xana of Asturias).
the Roman goddess Diana, who was often called Jana. Jana is also the feminine form of the Roman god Janus.
In Arabic Jana, is a noun which means to Earn or Reap and is used as a female name, but is pronounced as Janaa جنى.
In Albanian, short for Jehona which means echo, other short names include Jona, Ana, Hona
In Brazilian Portuguese, short for Janaina, a name with Amerindian and African origins, meaning "queen of the seas" or "mother of the fishes"
In Hebrew, Jana means "God is gracious"

People 
Jana (footballer)
Jana (Native American singer)
Jana (singer)
Jana Andrsová (born 1939), Czech ballerina and actress
Jana Asher, American statistician and human rights activist
Jana Assi, Lebanese footballer
Jana Bach (born 1979), German pornographic actress, model, and television host
Jana Begum, Mughal Indian noblewoman and scholar
Jana Beller (born 1990), Soviet-born German model
Jana Bellin (born 1947), chess player
Jana Bennett
Jana Bobošíková (born 1964), Czech politician
Jana Boková, Czech film director
Jana Brejchová (born 1940), Czech film actress
Jana Budajová (born 1992), Slovakian ice hockey goaltender
Jana Burčeska (born 1993), Macedonian singer
Jana Carpenter, American actress, singer and guitarist
Jana Čepelová (born 1993), Slovak tennis player
Jana Černá
Jana Dítětová (1926 – 1993), Czechoslovak film actress
Jana Doleželová (born 1981), Czech actress, model, pharmacist and beauty pageant titleholder 
Jana Dörries (born 1975), German swimmer 
Jana Dukátová (born 1983), Slovak slalom canoeist 
Jana Duļevska (born 1980), Latvian actress and TV presenter
Jana Elhassan (born 1985), Lebanese novelist and short story writer
Jana Farmanová (born 1970), Slovak contemporary figurative painter
Jana Fesslová (born 1976), Paralympian athlete from Czech Republic 
Jana Fett (born 1996), Croatian tennis player
Jana Galíková-Hlaváčová (born 22 January 1963), orienteering competitor who competed for Czechoslovakia
Jana Gantnerová (born 1989), Slovak Alpine skier
Jana Gereková (born 1984), Slovak biathlete
Jana Hlaváčková (born 1981), Czech tennis player
Jana Horáková (born 1983), Czech professional BMX cyclist
Jana Hubinská (born 1964), Slovak film and stage actress
Jana Hunter, musician
Jana Marie Hupp (born 1964), American actress
Jana Hybášková (born 1965), Czech and European politician and diplomat
Jana Ina (born 1976) Brazilian TV show host and model
Jana Jacková (born 1982), Czech chess player
Jana Jonášová (born 1943), Czech opera singer
Jana Jurečková (born 1940), Czech statistician
Jana Juřenčáková (born 1962), Czech politician and economist
Jana Juricová (born 1987), Slovak tennis player
Jana Kapustová (born 1983), Slovakian ice hockey player
Jana Khayat (born 1961), British businesswoman
Jana Khokhlova (born 1985), Russian former competitive ice dancer
Jana Kirschner (born 1978), Slovak singer and songwriter
Jana Knedlíková (born 1989), Czech handballer
Jana Kolarič (born 1954), Slovene author and translator
Jana Komrsková (born 1983), artistic gymnast from the Czech Republic
Jana Korbasová (born 1974), Slovak swimmer
Jana Košecká, Slovak-American computer scientist
Jana Králová, Czech football player
Jana Kramer (born 1983), American actress and country music singer
Jana Krausová, (born 1954), Czech actress
Jana Krishnamurthi (1928 – 2007), Indian political leader 
Jana Kubičková-Posnerová (born 1945), Slovak gymnast
Jana Kubovčáková, Czechoslovak slalom canoeist
Jana Labáthová (born 1988), Slovak synchronized swimmer
Jana Lacinová, Czech football player
Jana Linke-Sippl (born 1968), bodybuilder from Austria
Jana Majunke (born 1990), German Paralympic cyclist
Jana Malik, Pakistani actress
Jana Moravcová (born 1937), Czech poet, writer, and translator
Jana Mrázková (born 1940), Czech figure skater
Jana Müller (born 1978), German volleyball player 
Jana Nejedly (born 1974), Canadian tennis player but she was born in Prague, the capital of the Czech Republic
Jana Novotná (1968–2017), Czech tennis player
Jana Obrovská (1930 – 1987), Czech composer
Jana Pallaske (born 1979), German actress
Jana Pittman (born 1982), Australian athlete
Jana Plodková (born 1981), Czech actress
Jana Pospíšilová (born 1970), professional tennis player from the Czech Republic
Jana Rabasová (1933 – 2008), Czech gymnast 
Jana Revedin (born 1965), architect
Jana Riess (born 1969), American writer and editor 
Jana Rodriguez Hertz (born 1970), Argentine and Uruguayan mathematician
Jana S. Rošker (born 1960), Slovenian sinologist
Jana Roxas (born 1990), actress in the Philippines
Jana Rybářová (synchronized swimmer) (born 1978), Czech synchronized swimmer
Jana Šaldová (born 1975), Czech cross country skier
Jana Šikulová (born 1988), Czech artistic gymnast
Jana Šimánková (born 1980), Czech volleyball player
Jana Sinyor (born 1976), Canadian television writer and producer
Jana Šramková (born 1976), Czech rhythmic gymnast
Jana Sterbak, Canadian artist
Jana Švandová (born 1947), Czech actress
Jana Sýkorová (born 1973), Czech operatic contralto
Jana Taylor (1943 – 2004), American actress 
Jana Thiel (1971–2016), German sports presenter and journalist
Jana Tichá (born 1965), Czech astronomer
Jana Tucholke (born 1981), German discus thrower
Jana Vaľová, politician of the Slovak Republic
Jana Velďáková (born 1981), Slovak long jumper
Jana Veselá (born 1983), Czech professional basketball player
Jana Vojteková (born 1991), Slovak football midfielder 
Jana Zvěřinová (born 1937), Czechoslovak slalom canoeist

Fictional entities
Jana, a fictitious character in the television series Containment
Jana Hawkes Fisher, a character on the American soap opera The Young and the Restless
Jana von Lahnstein, fictional character in the German soap opera Verbotene Liebe (Forbidden Love)
Jana of the Jungle

See also
Jana (disambiguation)
Janus (disambiguation)

References

Arabic feminine given names
Czech feminine given names
English feminine given names
German feminine given names
Hebrew feminine given names
Slovak feminine given names